Monica Bonon (born 24 August 1964) is an Italian former swimmer. She competed in the women's 100 metre breaststroke at the 1980 Summer Olympics.

References

External links
 

1964 births
Living people
Olympic swimmers of Italy
Swimmers at the 1980 Summer Olympics
People from Casale Monferrato
Italian female breaststroke swimmers
Sportspeople from the Province of Alessandria
20th-century Italian women